Platysphinx stigmatica is a moth of the family Sphingidae. It is known from forests from Nigeria to the Congo, Angola and western Uganda.

References

Platysphinx
Moths described in 1878
Insects of the Democratic Republic of the Congo
Insects of West Africa
Insects of Uganda
Insects of Angola
Fauna of the Central African Republic
Fauna of the Republic of the Congo
Fauna of Gabon
Insects of Tanzania
Moths of Africa